was a town located in Mikata District, Fukui Prefecture, Japan.

As of 2003, the town had an estimated population of 9,026 and a density of 93.47 persons per km². The total area was 96.57 km². 

On March 31, 2005, Mikata, along with the town of Kaminaka (from Onyū District), was merged to create the town of Wakasa (in the newly created Mikatakaminaka District).

External links
 Wakasa official website 

Dissolved municipalities of Fukui Prefecture
Wakasa, Fukui